Zygocera pentheoides is a species of beetle in the family Cerambycidae. It was described by Francis Polkinghorne Pascoe in 1859. It is known from Australia.

References

Zygocerini
Beetles described in 1859